Steve Richardson may refer to:

 Steve Richardson (footballer) (born 1962), English professional footballer
 Steve Richardson (puzzle designer), founder of Stave Puzzles
 Steven Richardson (born 1966), English professional golfer
 Steven Richardson (Canadian football) (born 1996), American professional Canadian football defensive lineman
 Stephen Richardson (born 1959), Australian rules footballer
 Steve Richardson (ice hockey) (born 1949), Canadian hockey player
 Steve Richardson (politician) (born 1954), American politician
 Steve Richardson (squash player), Irish squash player